The Canada national rugby union team has played in every Rugby World Cup since the inaugural tournament in 1987. Their best performance was in 1991, when they beat Fiji and Romania, qualifying for the quarter-finals, where they lost to New Zealand.

Canada has the second strongest national rugby side in North America after the United States, and the fifth strongest in the Americas after Argentina, the United States, Uruguay and Chile.

Summary of results by tournament

By match

1987 Rugby World Cup
For the names of all Canada 1987 Rugby World Cup squad members, see 1987 Rugby World Cup squads# Canada.

Pool 2 games -

1991 Rugby World Cup

Pool 4 games -

Quarter-final

1995 Rugby World Cup

Pool A games -

1999 Rugby World Cup

Pool 3 games -

2003 Rugby World Cup

Group D games -

2007 Rugby World Cup
Pool B games -

2011 Rugby World Cup

Pool A games

2015 Rugby World Cup

Pool D games

2019 Rugby World Cup

Pool B Games

Notes:
Despite both teams naming their sides, this match was cancelled following an evacuation order in Kamaishi during Typhoon Hagibis and awarded as a 0–0 draw.

World Cup records

Overall record

Team records 
Most points scored in a game
72 vs  (1999)
37 vs  (1987)
34 vs  (1995)
25 vs  (2011)
23 vs  (2011)

Biggest winning margin
61 vs  (1999)
33 vs  (1987)
31 vs  (1995)
17 vs  (2003)
10 vs  (1991)

Most points conceded in a game
79 vs  (2011)
68 vs  (2003)
66 vs  (2019)
63 vs  (2019)
50 vs  (2015)

Biggest losing margin
64 vs  (2011)
63 vs  (2019)
62 vs  (2003)
59 vs  (2019)
43 vs  (2015)

Most tries scored in a game
9 vs  (1999)
7 vs  (1987)
3 vs  (1995)
3 vs  (2011)
3 vs  (2011)

Individual records 

Most World Cup matches
15 D. T. H. van der Merwe 2007-2019
14 Rod Snow 1995-2007
14 Jamie Cudmore 2003-2015
13 Gareth Rees 1987-1999
12 Al Charron 1991-2003
12 Aaron Carpenter 2007-2015

Most points overall
120 Gareth Rees
45 James Pritchard
30 D. T. H. van der Merwe
25 Bobby Ross
25 Mark Wyatt

Most points in a game
27 vs  – Gareth Rees 1999
19 vs  – Gareth Rees 1995
14 vs  – Gareth Rees 1999
10 vs  – James Pritchard 2011

Most tries overall
6 D. T. H. van der Merwe 2007, 2011, 2015
4 Al Charron 1991, 1995, 1999
4 Morgan Williams 1999, 2007
3 Rod Snow 1995, 1999

Most tries in a game
2 vs  – Pat Palmer 1987
2 vs  – Paul Vaesen 1987
2 vs  – Winston Stanley 1999
2 vs  – Rod Snow 1999
2 vs  – Kyle Nichols 1999
2 vs  – Conor Trainor 2011

Most penalty goals overall
25 Gareth Rees
9 James Pritchard
5 Jared Barker
5 Bobby Ross
5 Mark Wyatt

Most penalty goals in a game
4 vs  – Gareth Rees 2003
4 vs  – Gareth Rees 1995
4 vs  – Gareth Rees 1999

Most drop goals in a game
2 vs  – Ander Monro 2011
1 vs  – Gareth Rees 1987
1 vs  – Bobby Ross 2003
1 vs  – Gareth Rees 1999
1 vs  – Gareth Rees 1995
1 vs  – Gareth Rees 1991
1 vs  – Gareth Rees 1991

References

Works cited
 
 

World Cup
Rugby World Cup by nation